The Martin Auto Museum is a privately owned non-profit automobile museum located in Glendale, Arizona. The museum is dedicated to the preservation of collectible automobiles for educational purposes. Admission is a $10 donation per person over the age of 12. Some of the services provided by the museum include guided tours for such groups as local schoolchildren, veteran organizations and car clubs.

History

Mel Martin

The museum was founded by real estate developer Mel Martin to showcase his collection of vintage vehicles and automobile related memorabilia. He helped his family to make their house payments by selling newspapers. The family moved to Mayer, Arizona, a mining town, where his great uncle John Martin lived. Martin's father purchased a service station, where he worked pumping gas. He moved to Phoenix and became the owner of his own gas station which he named M&M. He then purchased several towing trucks and his business continued to grow. He became involved in other automobile related businesses and started a car auction company. Martin became involved in the sale and development of commercial real estate.

Martin began collecting cars since the 1960s. During the years his collection of vintage, historical and one of a kind cars continued to grow. He also collected memorabilia related to the automotive industry. Martin and his wife, Sallie Martin, realized that it would be best if they had a building with adequate space to show case their automobile collection and related artifacts.

Martin Auto Museum
In 2005, Martin organized his vehicles into a private collection and in 2008, he founded the Martin Auto Museum. The museum was originally located in a nondescript commercial building which Martin purchased alongside Interstate 17 on a frontage road in north Phoenix. The majority of the vehicles belong to Martin while a couple belong to the museum's board members.

The museum moved to a much larger location on the northwest 43rd Avenue and Thunderbird Road in early 2022. It now houses a collection of over 150 vehicles, as well as a full-size event center available to book. Each vehicle has a display which provides the visitor with the basic information of the vehicle in question. The information provided on the display includes the year, make, model, etc. of the vehicle.

There are various types of vehicles on display. Some are pre-1950 historical vintage cars and others are classic cars of the post 1950s era. Some are unique because of their low mileage and have a special-interest value. The museum also has a collection of automobile related memorabilia and a vintage carousal.

The museum is a non-profit organization open to the public. Guided tours have been provided to various organizations such as the local Veterans Administration Hospital, local community and social organizations, car clubs and trade school students. Besides the exhibits the museum has a conference room and a meeting room. The museum is also used for club meetings and wedding receptions.

The oldest vehicle on display in the museum is an 1886 Benz Patent-Motorwagen. Other vehicles of note on exhibit are the following:

A 1917 Douglas Dump Truck
A 1922 Chevrolet Boattail Race car
A 1929 Cadillac Dual Cowl Phaeton which was featured in "Arizona's Concours d'Elegence"
A 1930 convertible  Duesenberg "J" Boattail Speedster which once belonged to gangster John Factor, an associate of Al Capone
A 1954 custom built Oldsmobile with a 1954 Cadillac rear. The car was built for the 1977 movie "The Late Show" starring Art Carney and Lily Tomlin 
A 1959 AC Bristol, 1 of 21 built
The 1963 Chrysler 300 pace setter used in the 47th Indianapolis 500. 
A 1965 Shelby Cobra, once owned by Carroll Shelby. The vehicle's dashboard was autographed by Shelby
A 1990 Ford driven in NASCAR by Jeff Gordon
A 1992 Lister Corvette which is 1 of 3 concept cars built
A 2000 Pontiac Bonneville which set a  world record for a front wheel drive sedan

Also, among the vehicles exhibited is a 1940 McCormick Farmall Tractor and a 1948 American Flyer Whizzer Powered Motor Bike.

Museum Gallery
The following are photographs of some of the vehicles exhibited in the Martin Auto Museum. Also, pictured are some of the artifacts in the museum.

See also

Cave Creek Museum
List of museums in Arizona
List of historic properties in Phoenix, Arizona
Children's Museum in Phoenix 
Pioneer and Military Memorial Park
Pioneer Living History Museum
Phoenix Police Museum
Wells Fargo Museum

References

Museums in Phoenix, Arizona
Automotive museums
2008 establishments in Arizona